André Bachand may refer to:
André Bachand (Progressive Conservative MP) (born 1961), Canadian Member of Parliament who represented Richmond—Arthabaska from 1997 to 2004
André Bachand (Liberal MP) (born 1934), Canadian Member of Parliament who represented Missisquoi from 1980 to 1984